Tengku Hassanal Ibrahim Alam Shah ibni Al-Sultan Abdullah Ri’ayatuddin Al-Mustafa Billah Shah (Jawi: تڠكو حسن الإبراهيم عالم شاه ابن السلطان عبدﷲ رعاية الدين المصطفى بالله شاه) (born on 17 September 1995) is a member of Pahang Royal Family and currently reigning as Regent and Crown Prince of Pahang. His father is the current Sultan of Pahang, Al-Sultan Abdullah and his mother is the current Tengku Ampuan of Pahang, Tunku Azizah Aminah Maimunah Iskandariah.

Early life
Tengku Hassanal Ibrahim Alam Shah was born on 17 September 1995 at Tengku Ampuan Afzan Hospital, Kuantan, Pahang. He is the fourth child and second son and thus heir to the Tengku Mahkota (Crown Prince) of Pahang at that time, Tengku Abdullah Sultan Ahmad Shah and his consort the Tengku Puan (Crown Princess) of Pahang Tunku Azizah Sultan Iskandar. His eldest brother, Tengku Ahmad Iskandar Shah died immediately after he was born.

Education
He began his education at Sekolah Rendah Kebangsaan St. Thomas in Kuantan, and completed his secondary and upper secondary at Caldicott School and Sherbone School, United Kingdom. He then further his education at Geneva School of Diplomacy and International Relations in Switzerland and completed a Bachelor's Degree in International Relations.

On 13 September 2022, he pursued his postgraduate studies at the Lee Kuan Yew School of Public Policy, National University of Singapore.

Tengku Panglima Besar Pahang

Tengku Hassanal was appointed by his grandfather as Tengku Panglima Besar of Pahang on 18 June 2018.

Military career
As heir to the throne of Pahang, Tengku Hassanal had undergone military training at Royal Military Academy Sandhurst, United Kingdom for 44 weeks in 2019. He graduated from Sandhurst on 13 December 2019 with other 242 cadet officers commissioned at the Sovereign's Parade at Sandhurst, graced by Sophie, Countess of Wessex, as a representative of Queen Elizabeth II.

On 21 January 2020, Tengku Hassanal, along with his brother, Tengku Amir Nasser Ibrahim, was conferred the rank of Second Lieutenant while Tengku Amir was conferred the rank of Lieutenant Colonel by their father, Sultan Abdullah of Pahang. Upon completing military training and education, Tengku Hassanal is assigned to the 4th Mechanised Brigade of the 12th Battalion of the Royal Malay Regiment based in Pahang.

Tengku Mahkota of Pahang
Tengku Hassanal was proclaimed as the Tengku Mahkota of Pahang and Pemangku Raja Pahang on 29 January 2019. He is currently serving as Regent throughout his father's 5-year reign as the Yang di-Pertuan Agong.

The traditional proclamation ceremony was held at Balairung Seri, Istana Abu Bakar, Pekan where Tengku Hassanal took his oath of office and allegiance in front of his parents, family and state dignitaries. 2 days later, his father, the Sultan of Pahang, Al-Sultan Abdullah Ri’ayatuddin Al-Mustafa Billah Shah and the new Tengku Ampuan of Pahang, Tunku Azizah Aminah Maimunah Iskandariah Almarhum Sultan Iskandar, departs to Kuala Lumpur to reign as the Yang di-Pertuan Agong and Raja Permaisuri Agong.

His first official duty as Regent of Pahang was becoming the state representative at the Swearing in ceremony of his father, Sultan Abdullah as the 16th Yang di-Pertuan Agong of Malaysia on 31 January 2019. He also became Pahang's representative on his father's installation ceremony on 30 July 2019.

As Tengku Mahkota, Tengku Hassanal holds a number of important positions including as Chancellor of the Universiti Islam Pahang Sultan Ahmad Shah (UniPSAS) and President of the State Islamic Religious and Malay Customs Council (MUIP).

Personality
Tengku Hassanal is seen following his father and grandfather's footstep in establishing good and closer relation with the people living throughout the state of Pahang. Apart from his humble and friendly personality, Tengku Hassanal is also keen in learning and understanding his people's conditions and problems. He always spends time travelling around the state to get closer with the people.

Honours
  : 
  Member 1st class of the Family Order of the Crown of Indra of Pahang (DK I) (2019)
  Grand Knight of the Order of Sultan Ahmad Shah of Pahang (SSAP) — Dato' Sri (2016)
  Grand Knight of the Order of the Crown of Pahang (SIMP) — Dato' Indera

Places named after him

Several places were named after him, including:

 Tengku Mahkota Tengku Hassanal Ibrahim Alam Shah Mosque in Kuantan, Pahang

Ancestry

References

1995 births
Living people
Royal House of Pahang
People from Pahang
Malaysian people of Malay descent
Malaysian Muslims
People from Sherborne
People educated at Sherborne School
First Classes of the Family Order of the Crown of Indra of Pahang
Sons of monarchs